Deshabandu Umagiliya Durage Upul Chandana (born 7 May 1972), popularly known as Upul Chandana, is a  former Sri Lankan cricketer who played both Tests and ODIs. He was more specifically a leg spin bowler and was also an outstanding fielder. Unfortunately, Chandana was an unused squad player in 1996 world cup. Chandana is considered to be one of the best leg spinners ever played for Sri Lanka. He was also a competent lower-order batsman, having scored a total of seven half-centuries at international level.

School times
Upul Chandana started his cricketing career as a teenager  at Mahinda College, Galle.

Domestic career
Chandana has played county cricket in England for Gloucestershire County Cricket Club and represented Nondescripts in Sri Lankan. He made his Twenty20 debut on 17 August 2004, for Nondescripts Cricket Club in the 2004 SLC Twenty20 Tournament.

Chandana joined the Indian Cricket League, playing for the Kolkata Tigers and ICL World XI, and with four other Sri Lankan cricketers was banned, but the decision was lifted on 2009.

International career
Despite making his ODI debut in 1994 aged 21, Chandana had to wait for five years to be included in the Test team. It came in the Asian Test Championship Final in March 1999 against Pakistan. Chandana bowled 47.5 overs in the first innings and finished with 6 for 179.

Over the next few years he made sporadic appearances for Sri Lanka and in 2002 he was named as captain of Sri Lanka A, when they played an unofficial Test series against Kenya and Chandana topped both the batting and bowling averages. This helped him work his way back into the side in 2003 and after a match-winning innings against West Indies at Bridgetown, Chasing 313 for victory, he was promoted up the order to 5 and smashed 89 off just 71 deliveries with 6 sixes.  Since then he was a regular player in the one day team for the next few years.

When Muttiah Muralitharan withdrew from the 2004 tour to Australia, Chandana came into the Test side as the main spin bowler. Despite being expensive, he took a ten wicket haul in the 2nd Test at Cazalys Stadium in Cairns and is the only Sri Lankan bowler to take ten wickets in a test match in Australia.

Upul Chandana has the record for the highest test score when batting at number 9 for Sri Lanka(92).

Chandana retired from international cricket on 15 October 2007 after Bangladesh tour. In an emotional press conference, he said that he was forced to take the retirement decision because of the politics that existed in the team selections.

References

External links
 

1972 births
Living people
Sri Lanka One Day International cricketers
Sri Lanka Test cricketers
Gloucestershire cricketers
Tamil Union Cricket and Athletic Club cricketers
Nondescripts Cricket Club cricketers
Cricketers at the 1998 Commonwealth Games
Cricketers at the 1999 Cricket World Cup
ICL World XI cricketers
Royal Bengal Tigers cricketers
Alumni of Mahinda College
Cricketers who have taken five wickets on Test debut
Uva cricketers
Ruhuna cricketers
North Central Province cricketers
Cricketers from Galle
Cricketers at the 1996 Cricket World Cup
Sri Lankan cricket coaches
Deshabandu
Commonwealth Games competitors for Sri Lanka